Reginaia  is a genus of freshwater mussels, aquatic bivalve mollusks that is native to North America. 

This genus was separated from Fusconaia in 2012 based on genetic evidence.

Species
Species within this genus include: 
 Reginaia apalachicola - Apalachicola ebonyshell
 Reginaia ebenus - Ebonyshell
 Reginaia rotulata - Round ebonyshell

References

 
Bivalve genera